Tom Bush Wamukota (born 28 September 1993) is a Kenyan basketball player who currently plays for Rwanda Basketball League club APR and the Kenya national team.

College career
Wamukota played two years with the Wichita State Shockers men's basketball team. He was the first Kenyan player to ever play in the Sweet 16 of the NCAA tournament.

Professional career
In the summer of 2018, he played for Águilas Doradas Rionegro in Mexico. In the 2018–19 season, he played with Moroccan club MAS Fes.

In 2019, Wamukota played in Tunisia for US Monastir and later JS Kairouan.

In September 2020, Wamukota joined Rwandan side Patriots BBC. He won the national championship later that year, before extended his contract until 2023 in January.

In December 2021, Wamukota joined South Sudanese club Cobra Sport to strengthen the team for the second round of the 2022 BAL qualification. He was on Cobra Sport's roster for the primary BAL tournament, however, he was unable to play due to injury.

In 2022, Wamukota rejoined Patriots BBC for the Rwandan domestic league. He was named in the 2022 All Star Team.

In December 2022, Wamukota signed a one-year contract for APR.

National team career
Wamukota plays with the Kenya national basketball team and has represented the team at AfroCan 2019, where have averaged 10.5 points. He was named to the tournament's All-Star Five.

He has been part of Kenya's national team at the AfroBasket 2021 in Kigali, Rwanda.

BAL career statistics

|-
|style="text-align:left;"|2021
|style="text-align:left;"|Patriots
| 6 || 3 || 21.8 || .213 || .143 || .500 || 6.3 || 1.2 || .5 || .3 || 4.2
|- class="sortbottom"
| style="text-align:center;" colspan="2"|Career
| 6 || 3 || 21.8 || .213 || .143 || .500 || 6.3 || 1.2 || .5 || .3 || 4.2

References

External links

1993 births
Living people
Centers (basketball)
Patriots BBC players
Cobra Sport players
US Monastir basketball players
Kenyan men's basketball players
Kenyan expatriate basketball people in the United States
JS Kairouan basketball players
Maghreb de Fès basketball players
APR B.C. players